Kiska is an island in the Rat Islands group of the Aleutian Islands of Alaska. It may also refer to:

Kiska (surname), list of people with the surname
Kiska, an orca at Marineland of Canada
Kiska, Estonia, village in Hanila Parish, Lääne County, Estonia
Kiska, Altai Republic, village in Russia
USNS Kiska (T-AE-35), ship launched in 1972
USCGC Kiska (WPB-1336), US Island class cutter